Boy Lake is located in Glacier National Park, in the U. S. state of Montana. Boy Lake is approximately  WWN of Rising Wolf Mountain.

See also
List of lakes in Glacier County, Montana

References

Lakes of Glacier National Park (U.S.)
Lakes of Glacier County, Montana